Luz also known as Luz: The Flower of Evil or Luz, la flor del mal is a 2019 fantasy-western horror film written and directed by Juan Diego Escobar Alzate starring Yuri Vargas.  In October 2019 it was part of Official Fantastic Competition at the SITGES Fantastic Film Festival in Spain. The film has been selected in numerous international film festivals like Glasgow Film Festival, Nocturna Madrid, Almería Western Film Festival, Montevideo Fantastic, Fantaspoa, Peruvian Insólito, Sombra and Buenos Aires Rojo Sangre in which the film was winner for best Iberoamerican film, Best Photography, Best editing, Best acting for Yuri Vargas. Luz: The Flower of Evil also won the Silver Skull Award at the Morbido Film Fest in Mexico, where it had its Latin American Premiere.

The film had more than 68 official selections at international film festivals and has garnered 16 awards in its more than 40 nominations and was nominee for colombian Premios Macondo por Best Supporting Actress (Sharon Guzmán).

The film was a nominee for best latinamerican fantastic film of 2019 by the Meliés Federation.

Luz: The Flower of Evil is distributed by Shudder, Fractured Visions, Raven Banner and Dark Sky Films, among others and Afasia Films hold all rights and act as international sales agent for the film.

Plot
In the mountains, a preacher known as "The Lord" begins to lose credibility after promising the naïve inhabitants that he would invoke some kind of god in childlike form. However, the appearance of two enigmatic characters will challenge the true meaning of faith.

Cast
 Yuri Vargas as Uma
 Conrado Osorio as The Lord
 Jim Muñoz as Adam
 Daniel Páez as Elias
 Johan Camacho as Jesus
 Marcela Robledo as Ángela
 Sharon Guzman as Zion
 Andrea Esquivel as Laila

Festival honors
 SITGES Fantastic Film Festival 2019, Official Fantastic Competition World Premiere'
 Mórbido 2019, Mexico (Winner SILVER SKULL Best latinamerican film) Latin Premiere'
 Buenos Aires Rojo Sangre 2019, Argentina (Winner for best Iberoamerican film, Best Photography, Best editing, Best acting for Yuri Vargas)
 Meliés D'or Latinoamerica 2019, Argentina (Nominee Best Film of the Year 2019)
 Buffalo Dreams, US 2020 (Winner Best Film, Best Director, Best Actor for Conrado Osorio)
 Horrible Imaginings, US 2020 (Winner Best Film, Best Director, Best Cinematography, Best Actor for Conrado Osorio)
 Ravenna Nightmare Film Festival 2020, Italy - Special Mention Best Director
 Nocturna Madrid 2019, Spain (Sección Oficial en Competencia)
 Almería Western Film Festival 2019, Spain (Sección Oficial en Competencia)
 Buenos Aires Rojo Sangre 2019, Argentina (Ganadora Mejor película Iberoamericana, Mejor Fotografía, Mejor Montaje, Mejor Actuación por Yuri Vargas)
 Montevideo Fantástico 2019, Uruguay (Película en Competencia)
 Blood Window Screenings 2019, Argentina (Screenings)
 Meliés D'or Latinamerica 2019, Argentina (Nominado a Mejor película fantástica del año)
 NOX Film Fest, Uruguay (Sección Oficial en Competencia)
 INSÓLITO Fest 2020, Perú (Sección Oficial en Competencia)
 Glasgow Film Festival 2020, Scotland (Sección Oficial en Competencia) Premiere Reino Unido
 FANTASPOA 2020, Brazil (Sección Oficial en Competencia)
 SOMBRA 2020, Spain (Sección Blood Window)
 Galacticat 2020, Spain (Sección Oficial en Competencia)
 IndieBo 2020, Colombia (Película de Clausura)
 Night Visions 2020, Finland (Sección Oficial en Competencia)
 Buffalo Dreams 2020, U.S.A (Ganador Mejor Película, Mejor Director, Mejor Actor por Conrado Osorio)
 Horrible Imaginings 2020, U.S.A (Mejor Película, Mejor Director, Mejor Actor por Conrado Osorio, Mejor Dirección de Fotografía)
 Ravenna Nightmare Film Festival 2020, Italy - Mención Especial Mejor Director
 Panamá Horror Film Festival 2020, Panama - (Sección Oficial en Competencia)
 FANT Bilbao 2020, Spain - (Sección Panorama)
 Espanto Film Fest 2021, México - (Sección Oficial a Competencia)
 Macabro Film Fest 2021, México - (Sección Oficial a Competencia)
 El Grito 2021, Venezuela - (Sección Oficial)
 Festival Internacional de Cine de Cuenca 2021, Ecuador - (Zona Oscura)
 IIK!!-kauhuelokuvafestivaali 2020, Finland - (Official Selection)
 Oltre lo specchio, Italy - (Official Selection)
 Curtas, Spain - (Honorable Mention Best Latin Film)
 FESAALP 2020, Argentina - (Best Film "Aullidos)
 Fractured Visions 2020, UK - (Official Selection)
 Terror Cordoba 2020, Argentina - (Official Selection)
 Festival 1000 Gritos 2020, Argentina - (Official Selection)
 Bogotá Horror Film Festival 2021, Colombia - (Official Selection) 
 Zinema Zombie Film Fest 2021, Colombia - (Official Selection)
 Mostra de Cinema Fantástico Cine Horror 2021, Brazil - (Official Selection)
 Cinefantasy IFFF 2021, Brazil - (Official Selection)
 Medellin Horror Film Fest 2021, Colombia - (Winner Best Feature Film)
 SFTF Film Festival 2021, Colombia - (Best Film / Surprise Film)
 IndieCork Film Festival 2021, Ireland - (Official Selection)
 The Galactic Imaginarium Film Festival 2021, Rumania - (Fantasy Official Selection)
 Festival Boca do Inferno 2021, Brazil - (Official Selection)
 Espanto Film Fest 2021, Mexico - (Winner Best International Feature film)
 CUTÚN | Festival de terror y fantasia, 2021, Chile - (Official Selection)
 CINE HORROR - Mostra de Cinema Fantástico 2021, Brazil - (Official Selection)

References

External links
 
 

2019 films
2019 horror films
Mexican horror films
Colombian horror films
Spanish horror films
Canadian horror films
American horror films
British horror films
Taiwanese horror films
Argentine horror films
Paraguayan horror films
Costa Rican speculative fiction films
2010s fantasy drama films
Spanish-language Canadian films
2010s American films
2010s Canadian films
2010s British films
2010s Mexican films
2010s Argentine films
2010s Colombian films